Oyet is a surname of African origin.

People with the surname include:

 Julia Clare Oyet, Ugandan banker
 Nathaniel Oyet, South Sudanese politician
 Ugbana Oyet (born 1976) is a Nigerian-born British chartered engineer and Serjeant-at-Arms of the House of Commons

See also 
 Oyetunde
 Ballen i øyet

Surnames
Surnames of African origin